Yerself Is Steam is the 1991 debut album by Mercury Rev. The title is a malapropism of the phrase "Your self-esteem," and is taken from a recurring lyric in the opening "Chasing a Bee."  "Car Wash Hair" was released as a single to follow the album.  "Very Sleepy Rivers" is supposedly about a serial killer, with the river acting as a metaphor for the killer's relative calm and sudden tendency to snap.

A music video for the song "Chasing a Bee" was shot at an abandoned infectious disease hospital that once housed "Typhoid Mary" on North Brother Island in New York City, and was directed by Jim Spring and Jens Jurgensen.

Dean Wareham made a guest appearance on "Car Wash Hair" and helped with recording, supposedly after Fridmann spent the band's advance on a holiday package.

In 2016, Pitchfork ranked the album at number 16 in its list of "The 50 Best Shoegaze Albums of All Time," commenting that "Yerself Is Steam is really a shoegaze album in the inverse: Where their fuzz-pedaling peers obliterated the human presence in rock music through a cloud of distortion, Mercury Rev foregrounded the claustrophobic, panicky unease of being trapped inside it."

Track listing
All songs written by Mercury Rev.
 "Chasing a Bee" – 7:11 (4:27)
 "Syringe Mouth" – 4:04 (3:27)
 "Coney Island Cyclone" – 2:37 (3:27)
 "Blue and Black" – 6:00 (4:27)
 "Sweet Oddysee of a Cancer Cell t' th' Center of Yer Heart" – 7:41 (5:27)
 "Frittering" – 8:48 (4:27)
 "Continuous Trucks and Thunder Under a Mother's Smile" – 0:43 (2:27)
 "Very Sleepy Rivers" – 12:15 (13:15 on Sony/Columbia CD edition) (12:27)
 "Car Wash Hair (The Bee's Chasing Me)" – 6:44 (hidden bonus track on Sony/Columbia CD edition)

Formatting notes
 The back cover lists deliberately erroneous run times.  They are listed above in (parentheses and italics).
 On the American Sony/Columbia pressing of the album, "Very Sleepy Rivers" is divided amongst tracks 8 through 98. Track 8 contains the first 7:15, while the rest of the song is split amongst the following 90 4-second tracks, netting the song an additional minute in the process. The audio slowly fades out around track 83 and, around track 88, someone starts saying 'pick' repeatedly with some barely audible laughter.  During this quieter section, a low-level sub-bass signal (under 20 Hz) was mixed underneath. The unusual method of splitting the track was included in Pitchfork Media's 2010 list of "ten unusual CD-era gimmicks". The bonus song "Car Wash Hair" follows as track 99 on this pressing.

Lego My Ego
In 1992, Mint Films/Jungle re-released Yerself is Steam with a bonus LP/CD entitled Lego My Ego.  The title is a parody of the Eggo waffles ad slogan, and is taken from a piece of voice tape at the start of "Frittering," where one musician tells another to "let go of my fucking ego" after they tell him how to play a song.  It consists of rare tracks and a Peel Session.  Mint Films released another edition in 2007 consisting of both CDs plus an all-region DVD of the videos for "Chasing a Bee" and "Car Wash Hair."

CD version:
1 is a cover of the Sly and the Family Stone song, originally released on the A-side of a 7" single in March 1992 by the Rough Trade Singles Club.
2 is recorded live by the BBC Mobile Recording Studio at Finsbury Park, London, June 1992.  "Shhh/Peaceful" is a cover of the Miles Davis song (from In a Silent Way), which is only quoted briefly in the introduction.
3, 4, 6 and 8 are from a Peel Session recorded on August 27, 1991 and first broadcast on October 5, 1991.  8 is "Chasing a Bee" with some changed lyrics.  Some releases title it "Chasing a Girl (Inside a Car)," which is what is sung in the title line of this version.  The liner notes add about this song, "Guitars should be much louder, but what can you do?"
5 is the same recording as the single version, but with some extra material crossfaded in at the end.  1, 3, 4 and 8 also have unusual tapes (mostly voice) added and to the beginning and/or end of the songs.
7 is credited as being the "original theme from the 1991 motion picture 'Moonbuggy,' a film by Howard Nelson," and performed by Grasshopper.

 If You Want Me to Stay – 4:08
 Shhh/Peaceful / Very Sleepy Rivers – 14:52
 Frittering – 5:18
 Coney Island Cyclone – 3:20
 Car Wash Hair – 7:25
 Syringe Mouth – 3:11
 Blood on the Moon – 8:21
 Chasing a Bee (Inside a Car) – 10:09

LP version:
 Shhh/Peaceful / Very Sleepy Rivers – 14:52
 Blood on the Moon – 8:21
 Frittering – 5:18
 Coney Island Cyclone – 3:20
 Syringe Mouth – 3:11
 Chasing a Bee (Inside a Car) – 10:09

All songs written by Mercury Rev, except "If You Want Me to Say" by Sly Stone and "Shhh/Peaceful" by Miles Davis.  "Blood on the Moon" has no writer's credit, but is presumably also written by Grasshopper.

Radio Whipped promo edition
Sony/Columbia released a promo double-CD version of the album in 1992.  The first disc is the U.S. version of the album.  The second disc is the U.S. "Chasing a Bee" CD single.  A "Radio Whipped Sticker" on the back of the CD jewelbox numbers the nine tracks on the album as A, B, C, D, E, F, U, C, K, and the six tracks of the single as:

A.  Chasing A Bee (7:09)
B.  If You Want Me To Stay (3:37)
S.  Coney Island Cyclone (2:40)
U.  Frittering (4:26)
R.  Syringe Mouth (3:09)
D.  Chasing A Girl (Inside A Car) (6:56)

S, U, R, and D are the Peel Session recordings, and are actually one continuous track for 17:53.  The run times for B, S, U and D are shorter than on Lego My Ego because they don't contain the unusual tape material that was added to these songs on it.

Personnel
 Jonathan Donahue – silver pickup guitar, vocals
 Grasshopper – unafon guitar reels
 Suzanne Thorpe – point red flute
 Dave Fridmann – bass explore, majestic bellowphone, additional engineering
 David Baker – vocals
 Jimy Chambers – drumming, blue-line
 C. Gavazzi - trumpet on "Car Wash Hair"
 Dean Wareham - additional vocals, production on "Car Wash Hair"
 Keith Cleversley - engineer
 Kristin Peterson - photography
 Mooneyham - artwork

References

Mercury Rev albums
1991 debut albums
Albums produced by Dave Fridmann
Art pop albums
Art punk albums